was a Japanese military leader and theorist in Bakumatsu period Japan. He was the "Father" of the Imperial Japanese Army, launching a modern military force closely patterned after the French system of the day.

Early life and education
Ōmura was born in what is now part of Yamaguchi city, in the former Chōshū Domain, where his father was a rural physician. From a young age, Ōmura had a strong interest in learning and medicine, travelling to Osaka to study rangaku under the direction of Ogata Kōan at his Tekijuku academy of western studies when he was twenty-two. He continued his education in Nagasaki under the direction of German physician Philipp Franz von Siebold, the first European to teach Western medicine in Japan. His interest in Western military tactics was sparked in the 1850s and it was this interest that led Ōmura to become a valuable asset after the Meiji Restoration in the creation of Japan's modern army.

Early career
After studying in Nagasaki, Ōmura returned to his village at the age of twenty-six to practice medicine, but accepted an offer from daimyō Date Munenari of nearby Uwajima Domain in 1853 to serve as an expert in Western studies and a military school instructor in exchange for the samurai rank that he was not born into. As foreign incursions into Japanese territorial waters increased, and as pressure from foreign powers for Japan to end its national seclusion policy, Ōmura was sent back to Nagasaki to study the construction of warships and navigation. He traveled to Edo in 1856 in the retinue of Date Munenari and was appointed a teacher at the shogunate's Bansho Shirabesho institute for western studies. During this time, he also continued his education by learning English under the Yokohama-based American missionary James Curtis Hepburn.

In 1861, Chōshū domain hired Ōmura back to teach at the Chōshū military academy and to reform and modernize the domainal army; they too gave him the ranking of samurai. It was this same year that Ōmura began his involvement with Kido Takayoshi, a political moderate who served as liaison between the domain bureaucracy and radical elements among the young, lower-echelon Chōshū samurai who supported the Sonnō jōi movement and the violent overthrow of Tokugawa rule.

As a Military Leader
After his return to Chōshū, Ōmura not only introduced modern western weaponry, but he also introduced the concept of military training for both samurai and commoners. The concept was highly controversial, but Ōmura was vindicated when his troops routed the all-samurai army of the Shogunate in the Second Chōshū Expedition of 1866. These same troops also formed the core of the armies of the Satchō Alliance at the Battle of Toba–Fushimi, Battle of Ueno and other battles of the Boshin War of the Meiji Restoration from 1867 to 1868.

The Making of the Meiji Military
After the Meiji Restoration, the government recognized the need for a stronger military force that placed their loyalty in the central government as opposed to individual domains. Under the new Meiji government, Ōmura was appointed to the post of hyōbu daiyu, which was equivalent to the role of Vice Minister of War in the newly created Army-Navy Ministry. In this role, Ōmura was tasked with the creation of a national army along western lines. Ōmura sought to duplicate the policies he had previously successfully implemented in Chōshū on a larger scale, namely, the introduction of conscription and military training for commoners, rather than reliance on a hereditary feudal force. He also strongly supported the discussions towards the abolition of the han system, and with it, the numerous private armies maintained by the daimyō, which he considered a drain on resources and a potential threat to security.

During a council meeting in June 1869, Ōmura argued that if "the government was determined to become militarily independent and powerful, it was necessary to abolish the fiefs and the feudal armies, to do away with the privileges of the samurai class, and to introduce universal military conscription". Ōmura's ideal military consisted of an army patterned after that of the Napoleonic French armies and a navy that was patterned after the British Royal Navy. For this reason, even though the French government had lent tactic support to the Tokugawa regime during the wars of the Meiji Restoration through supply of weapons and military advisors, Ōmura continued to push for the return of the French military mission to train his new troops.

Ōmura faced opposition from many of his peers, including most conservative samurai who saw his ideas on modernizing and reforming the Japanese military as too radical. What Ōmura was advocating was not only ending the livelihood of thousands of samurai, but also the end of their privileged position in society.

A man of strong character, Ōmura had come to entertain such disgust at the cramped military system of feudalism that a story is told of his refusing to talk to a close companion of arms who offended him by wearing his long samurai sword during a conference.

Assassination
It was the opposition of some of these samurai that led to his demise in the late 1860s. While in the Kansai region looking at sites for future military schools in September 1869, Ōmura was attacked by eight disgruntled ex-samurai, ironically, mostly from Chōshū.

These ex-samurai were followers of the by-then abandoned sonnō jōi movement and retained a zealously xenophobic antipathy to foreigners and Western ideas. On the night of October 9, 1869, he and several associates were attacked at an inn in Kyoto. Wounded in several places, he barely escaped with his life by hiding in a bath full of dirty water. The wound on his leg would not heal and he traveled to Osaka to be treated by the Dutch doctor A. F. Bauduin, who wanted to amputate his leg. However, before the operation could be performed, Ōmura succumbed to his wounds in early November of that year.

Ōmura's assassins were soon apprehended and sentenced to death, but were reprieved due to political pressure at the last moment by government officials who shared their views that Omura's reforms were an affront to the samurai class. They were executed a year later.

Legacy

Soon after Ōmura's death, a bronze statue was built in his honor by Ōkuma Ujihiro. The statue was placed in the monumental entry to Yasukuni Shrine, in Tokyo. The shrine was erected to Japanese who have died in battle and remains one of the most visited and respected shrines in Japan. The statue was the first Western style sculpture in Japan

Ōmura's ideas for modernizing Japan's military were largely implemented after his death by his followers such as Yamagata Aritomo, Kido Takayoshi, and Yamada Akiyoshi. Yamada Akiyoshi was the strongest leader out of the four and was mainly responsibly for establishing Japan's modern military using Ōmura's ideas. Yamada promoted Ōmura's ideas by establishing new military academies that taught Ōmura's ways. Yamagata Aritomo and Saigō Tsugumichi also had Ōmura's ideas in mind when passing legislation imposing universal military conscription in 1873.

Yamagata Aritomo, a devoted follower of Ōmura, traveled to Europe to study military science and military techniques that could be adapted in Japan. Upon returning from Europe, he organized a 10,000 men force to form the core of the new Imperial Japanese Army. As Ōmura had hoped for, the French military mission returned in 1872 to help equip and train the new army. Although Ōmura died before having the opportunity to enforce many of his radical ideas, the lasting impression that he left on his followers led to his policies and ideas to shape the making of the Meiji military years later.

Notes

References and further reading
 Huber, Thomas. The Revolutionary Origins of Modern Japan. Stanford University Press (1981)
 Kublin, Hyman. "The 'Modern' Army of Early Meiji Japan". The Far Eastern Quarterly, Vol. 9, No. 1. (November, 1949), pp. 20–41.
 Norman, E. Herbert. "Soldier and Peasant in Japan: The Origins of Conscription." Pacific Affairs 16#1 (1943), pp. 47–64.

External links

 National Diet Library Bio & Photo
 Global Security - Meiji Military

1824 births
1869 deaths
People from Yamaguchi (city)
Japanese military leaders
Meiji Restoration
People of Meiji-period Japan
Assassinated Japanese politicians
People murdered in Japan
1869 murders in Japan